William Paul Jarrett (August 22, 1877 – November 10, 1929) was a sheriff and congressional delegate representing the Territory of Hawaii.

Biography
Jarrett was born August 22, 1877 and grew up in Honolulu, Hawaii, on the island of Oahu, and attended Saint Louis School. Of Native Hawaiian descent, his father was William Kaauwai Jarrett and mother was Emma Kaoo Stevens. He married Mary H. K. Clark with whom he had six children.

Jarrett became one of the earliest leaders of the Hawaii Democratic Party.  Jarrett served as deputy Sheriff of the City & County of Honolulu from 1906 to 1908, Sheriff until 1914, and High Sheriff of the Territory of Hawaii from 1914 to 1922.

From March 4, 1923 to March 3, 1927, Jarrett served in the United States Congress as a territorial delegate. He won elections in November 1922 and 1924, but lost the bid for re-election in 1927. He died on November 10, 1929.

He was interred at Diamond Head Memorial Park. William P. Jarrett Middle School, established in 1955, was named after him.

See also 
List of Asian Americans and Pacific Islands Americans in the United States Congress

References

1877 births
1929 deaths
Delegates to the United States House of Representatives from the Territory of Hawaii
Democratic Party members of the United States House of Representatives from Hawaii
Hawaii Democrats
20th-century American politicians
Hawaii sheriffs
Native Hawaiian politicians
American people of Native Hawaiian descent
Saint Louis School alumni